Fernando Travassos Tordo (born 29 March 1948) is Portuguese singer and songwriter. Since 2003 he has been a Commander of the Order of Merit, an honor bestowed on him by the Portuguese President Jorge Sampaio.

Considered one of the most prolific songwriters of the Portuguese songbook, he is deemed by critics as a key figure in Portuguese contemporary music for the extension and originality of his work. Both as a singer and as a songwriter, Fernando Tordo has worked in the realms of fado, música ligeira and political intervention arts. 

His lengthy work collaboration with poet José Carlos Ary dos Santos was a mark that propelled him into fame, resulting in songs such as "Tourada", "Estrela da Tarde", "Lisboa Menina e Moça", "Cavalo à Solta", "Balada para os Nossos Filhos", "O Amigo que eu canto", "Meu Corpo" and "Novo Fado Alegre".

As an author and songwriter he has collaborated with numerous Portuguese and international singers such as Carlos do Carmo, Mariza, Carminho, Amor Electro, Simone de Oliveira, Beatriz da Conceição, Ana Moura, António Zambujo, Ivan Lins and Dulce Pontes.

As a singer, he has represented Portugal twice at the Eurovision Song Contest in 1973 and 1977 due to national victories at the Festival RTP da Canção with the songs "Tourada" first and "Portugal no Coração" later.

References

1948 births
Living people
Portuguese songwriters
20th-century Portuguese male singers
Singers from Lisbon
Eurovision Song Contest entrants of 1973
Eurovision Song Contest entrants of 1977
Eurovision Song Contest entrants for Portugal